The following is a list of episodes for the American late night talk show Totally Biased with W. Kamau Bell.

Series overview

Episodes

Season 1 (2012–13)

Season 2 (2013)

References

External links
 Official Website

Lists of American non-fiction television series episodes